James Findlay Hendry (12 September 1912 – 17 December 1986) was a Scottish poet known also as an editor and writer. He was born in Glasgow, and read Modern Languages at the University of Glasgow. During World War II he served in the Royal Artillery and the Intelligence Corps.  After the war he worked as a translator for international organizations, including the UN and the ILO. He later took a chair at Laurentian University. He died in Toronto.

He edited with Henry Treece the poetry anthology The New Apocalypse (1939) which gave its name to the New Apocalyptics poetic group. The long poem Marimarusa was published in 1978.

Other works
The White Horseman (1941) poetry anthology with Henry Treece
Bombed Happiness (1942); 
The Orchestral Mountain (1943)  
Scottish Short Stories (1943) (ed.)
Crown and Sickle (1944) poetry anthology with Henry Treece
The Blackbird of Ospo (1945) novel 
Fernie Brae (1947) novel
Scottish Short Stories (1969) (ed.)
Your Career as a Translator and Interpreter (1980) 
A World Alien (1980) 
The Sacred Threshold: a life of Rilke (1982)
The Disinherited

References 

1912 births
1986 deaths
Writers from Glasgow
20th-century Scottish poets
 Scottish male poets
20th-century British male writers
British Army personnel of World War II
Royal Artillery personnel
Intelligence Corps soldiers
Military personnel from Glasgow